Blauensteiner is a surname. Notable people with the surname include: 

Elfriede Blauensteiner (1931–2003), Austrian serial killer
Leopold Blauensteiner (1880–1947), Austrian academic painter
Michael Blauensteiner (born 1995), Austrian footballer